Ceratophallus is a genus of freshwater air-breathing snails, aquatic pulmonate gastropod mollusks in the family Planorbidae, the ram's horn snails, or planorbids. All species in this genus have sinistral or left-coiling shells. Snails in this genus are found in Africa and some Indian Ocean islands.

Species
Species within this genus include:
 Ceratophallus apertus
 Ceratophallus bicarinatus
 Ceratophallus coretus
 Ceratophallus crassus
 Ceratophallus faini
 Ceratophallus gibbonsi (Nelson)
 Ceratophallus kisumiensis (Preston, 1912)
 Ceratophallus natalensis (Krauss)
 Ceratophallus pelecystoma
 Ceratophallus socotrensis (Godwin-Austen, 1883)
 Ceratophallus yesimit Brown, 2001

References

External links 
 GBIF info here: 

Planorbidae
Taxonomy articles created by Polbot